Chaetostephana rendalli is a moth of the  family Noctuidae. It is found in Angola, the Democratic Republic of Congo, Malawi, Tanzania and Zambia.

References

Moths described in 1896
Agaristinae
Lepidoptera of the Democratic Republic of the Congo
Lepidoptera of Angola
Lepidoptera of Malawi
Lepidoptera of Tanzania
Moths of Sub-Saharan Africa